The 16th Aerobic Gymnastics World Championships took place in Baku, Azerbaijan from May 27 to 29, 2021.

Event

Medal table

Results

Women's Individual

Individual Men

Mixed Pair

Trios

Group

Aerobic Step

Aerobic Dance

Team

References

External links
FIG site
Results Book

2021 in gymnastics
Aerobic Gymnastics World Championships
Sports competitions in Baku
International gymnastics competitions hosted by Azerbaijan
Aerobic Gymnastics World Championships
Aerobic Gymnastics World Championships